Nabuyongo Island, also known as Godsiba, is a small island in Lake Victoria, Tanzania.  During the First World War it was the site of naval action between British and German lake steamers.

Lake islands of Tanzania
Islands of Lake Victoria